Grafton Airport was a private airfield that was operational during the mid-20th century in Grafton, Massachusetts.

References

Defunct airports in Massachusetts
Airports in Worcester County, Massachusetts
Grafton, Massachusetts